Persisko stands for Persatuan Sepakbola Indonesia Sarolangun Bangko (en: Football Association of Indonesia Sarolangun Bangko). Persisko is an  Indonesian football club based in Merangin Regency, Jambi. They currently compete in the Liga 3.

Stadium
Persisko Merangin play their home matches at Bumi Masurai Stadium

References

External links
Official website
Persisko at Liga-Indonesia.co.id
Official fans page on facebook.com

Football clubs in Indonesia
Football clubs in Jambi
1960 establishments in Indonesia
Association football clubs established in 1960